A women's interest channel generally refers to either a television station, network or specialty channel that targets women as its main demographic; offering programs that will appeal to the female population. 

There are two types of female interest channels: general interest and niche interest.

General interest
General interest women's channels are television channels that contain programming from diverse genres and categories that will appeal to the female population including films, lifestyle series, dramatic series, reality series, and talk shows on varying topics including cooking, travel, cars, sexism, and sports.

Examples of general interest female channels
 9Gem (Australia)
 10 Peach (Australia)-owned by Paramount
 Colours (Philippines)
 Cosmopolitan TV (Canada, defunct)
 Diva Universal (Asia)-owned by NBCUniversal
 Divinity (Spain)
 Ion Mystery (United States)-owned by Scripps
 ITVBe (UK)
 Start TV (United States)-owned by Weigel Broadcasting
 Estil 9 (Spain)
 ETC (Philippines)
 Eve (Southeast Asia)
 La5 (Italy)
 Lifestyle (Philippines, defunct)
 Lifetime (United States and Canada)-owned by A&E Networks
 Living (UK)
 Markíza Doma (Slovakia)
 MOI&cie (Canada)
 Metro Channel (Philippines)
 Mya (Italy, defunct)
 MYTV (Indonesia, defunct)
 Nova (Spain)
 Nova Lady (Czech Republic)
 OnStyle (South Korea)
 OWN (United States and Canada)-owned by WBD
 Oxygen (United States)-owned by NBCUniversal
 Passion (Germany)
 RTL 8 (Netherlands)
 RTL Passion (Germany)
 SIC Mulher (Portugal)
 Sixx (Germany)
 Slice (Canada)
 Sony Channel (Southeast Asia)
 STAR World (Asia, defunct)
 Téva (France)
 Twist TV (Canada, defunct)
 VH1 (United States)-owned by Paramount
 W Network (Canada)
 WE tv (United States)-owned by A&E Networks
 Her TV (Hong Kong)
 Velvet (Philippines, defunct)

Niche interest
Niche interest women's channels are television channels that contain programming with a specific television genre such as film channels, and lifestyle channels.

Examples of women's interest niche channels
 Acasă (Romania) 
 Acasă Gold (Romania) 
 Lifetime (Poland)-owned by A&E Networks
 LMN (United States)-owned by A&E Networks
 Național 24 Plus (Romania) 
 Polsat Café (Poland) 
 Prima Love (Czech Republic) 

Women's mass media
Women in television
Women's interest channels